William Tennyson Cubbins (4 May 1899 – 3 January 1968) was an Australian rules footballer who played in the Victorian Football League (VFL).

Cubbins played with St Kilda as possibly the greatest full back of his time. He won a record four club best and fairest awards (equalled by Robert Harvey). Cubbins was an excellent mark and long kick.

He was captain / coach of Warrnambool in 1927 and lead them to the premiership of the Western District Football Association.

He returned to St. Kilda in 1928.

In Round 14 of the 1920 Reserves season, Cubbins kicked a reserve grade record 22 goals in St Kilda FC's 230 point win over West Melbourne 38.27 (255) to 3.7 (25), including 12.4 (76) of the Saints 12.6 (78) in the final quarter.

References

Links
Saints honour roll
Bio at Saints.com.au

1899 births
St Kilda Football Club coaches
Trevor Barker Award winners
St Kilda Football Club players
Western Bulldogs players
Western Bulldogs coaches
Warrnambool Football Club players
Australian rules footballers from Melbourne
Australian military personnel of World War I
1968 deaths
People from St Kilda, Victoria
Military personnel from Melbourne